Kyrylo Khovayko (born 17 June 2001) is a professional Ukrainian football midfielder.

Career
Khovayko is a product of the Inter and the Dnipro youth sportive schools in his native Dnipropetrovsk Oblast and in July 2018 he signed a contract with Ukrainian side SC Dnipro-1, that was promoted to the Ukrainian First League in this time.

In December 2020 he was promoted to the main squad to play in the Ukrainian Premier League. Khovayko made his debut in the Ukrainian Premier League for SC Dnipro-1 as a second-half substituted player on 6 December 2020, playing in a losing away match against FC Zorya Luhansk.

References

External links
Statistics at UAF website (Ukr)

2001 births
Living people
People from Kamianske
Ukrainian footballers
SC Dnipro-1 players
Ukrainian Premier League players
Association football midfielders
Sportspeople from Dnipropetrovsk Oblast